Pamoic acid, also called embonic acid, is a 2-Naphthoic acid derivative.  Salts and esters of pamoic acid are known as pamoates or embonates.  It can be prepared by the reaction of 3-hydroxy-2-naphthoic acid with formaldehyde.  

In pharmacology, the salt form of pamoic acid (pamoate ion) can be used as a counterion of a drug compound to affect the dissolution rate of the drug.  The presence of multiple oxygen atoms enables significant hydrogen bonding to occur. Hydrogen bonds facilitate the dissolution of compounds in water.  Pharmaceutical drugs formulated this way include cycloguanil pamoate, hydroxyzine pamoate, imipramine pamoate, olanzapine pamoate hydrate, oxantel pamoate, pyrantel pamoate, and pyrvinium pamoate.

Pamoic acid has agonist activity for the orphan G protein-coupled receptor GPR35 by which it activates ERK and beta-arrestin2, and causes antinociceptive activity.

References 

Dicarboxylic acids
2-Naphthols
Naphthoic acids
Alpha hydroxy acids
Diols